Abdelkrim Zouari (born 14 July 1989 in Saïda) is an Algerian footballer who play as a striker for USM Alger in the Algerian Ligue Professionnelle 1.

International career
Zouari made his senior debut with the Algeria national football team in a friendly 2-0 loss to Saudi Arabia on 9 May 2018.

Honours

Clubs
 USM Bel Abbès
 Algerian Cup (1): 2018
 Algerian Super Cup (1): 2018

 USM Alger
 Algerian Ligue Professionnelle 1 (1): 2018–19

References

External links

1989 births
People from Saïda
Living people
Association football forwards
Algerian footballers
Algeria international footballers
MC Saïda players
Olympique de Médéa players
JSM Tiaret players
USM Bel Abbès players
21st-century Algerian people